Afro Blue  is the debut studio album by American jazz singer Dee Dee Bridgewater. The record was released in Japan in 1974, when she was 23, via Trio Records label. The album was recorded in Tokyo with a quintet of musicians including brothers Ron and Cecil Bridgwater.

Track listing

Personnel
Band
Dee Dee Bridgewater – vocals
George Mraz – bass
Motohiko Hino – drums, bells 
Roland Hanna – piano
Ron Bridgewater – tenor saxophone, cowbell, African castanets, vibra-clap 
Cecil Bridgewater – trumpet, kalimba

Production
Takao Ishizuka – producer
Kiyoshi Koyama – liner notes
Y. Kannari – recording, mixing
M. Ohkawa – recording, mixing

References

External links 

Dee Dee Bridgewater albums
1974 debut albums